The S. D. Newton House is a historic house at 8 Sycamore Street in Worcester, Massachusetts. Built in 1846, it is an excellent local instance of Greek Revival styling, and one of the few houses surviving from that period in the neighborhood. which once had many more of such houses. The house was listed on the National Register of Historic Places on March 5, 1980. Unfortunately the current keeper of the home has let it go. Not much original left. Garbage everywhere on the inside. Lead paint, peeling paint. An eyesore it has become. It once was a great piece of local history.

Description and history
The Newton House is located just south of Worcester's downtown area, on the northeast side of Sycamore Street in a mixed residential and commercial area. It is a -story wood-frame house, with a front-facing gable roof and clapboard siding.  It is set on a lot fronted by a low granite curb and a picket fence. The building corners have paneled pilasters, which rise to an entablature below the fully pedimented gable and extending along the building sides. A single-story porch extends across the building width, with fluted Doric columns rising to an entablature beneath a shallow hip roof. The front facade is three bays wide, with the entrance in the right bay, flanked by sidelight windows and narrow pilasters, and topped by an entablature.

The house was built in 1846, and typifies the houses that were built in the immediate area in the 1840s, although it is now one of the few houses left from that period. Most of the houses from that period have been replaced either by later residential construction or commercial buildings. The house's first known occupant was S. D. Newton, a painter; later residents include a victualler and telegrapher. The current resident, a hoarder.

See also
National Register of Historic Places listings in northwestern Worcester, Massachusetts
National Register of Historic Places listings in Worcester County, Massachusetts

References

Houses completed in 1849
Houses in Worcester, Massachusetts
National Register of Historic Places in Worcester, Massachusetts
1849 establishments in Massachusetts
Houses on the National Register of Historic Places in Worcester County, Massachusetts
Greek Revival houses in Massachusetts